(7025) 1993 QA is a sub-kilometer asteroid classified as near-Earth object of the Apollo and Amor group, respectively. It was discovered on 16 August 1993, by astronomers of the Spacewatch program at the Kitt Peak National Observatory near Tucson, Arizona, United States. The asteroid measures approximately half a kilometer in diameter and has a short rotation period of 2.5057 hours.

Orbit and classification 

 is a member of the dynamical Apollo group, which are Earth-crossing asteroids. Conversely, it is classified as a non-Earth crossing Amor asteroid by the Minor Planet Center, due to its near-threshold perihelion of 1.011 AU.

It orbits the Sun at a distance of 1.01–1.94 AU once every 21 months (655 days; semi-major axis of 1.48 AU). Its orbit has an eccentricity of 0.31 and an inclination of 13° with respect to the ecliptic. The body's observation arc begins with its official discovery observation by Spacewatch on 16 August 1993.

Close approaches 

Physical characteristics 

 has been characterized as a dark D-type asteroid on images taken by the Sloan Digital Sky Survey. Conversely, Pan-STARRS photometric survey determined a much brighter S-type.

Rotation period 

Lightcurve analysis gave an identical, well-defined rotation period of 2.5057 hours with a brightness amplitude of 0.32 and 0.50 magnitude, respectively. Its period is near the cohesionless spin-barrier of 2.2 hours, which set the upper limit for fast-rotating asteroids.

Diameter and albedo 

According to the survey carried out by the NEOWISE mission of NASA's Wide-field Infrared Survey Explorer,  measures 498 meters in diameter and its surface has a high albedo of 0.340. The Collaborative Asteroid Lightcurve Link assumes a standard albedo for stony asteroids of 0.20 and derives a diameter of 770 meters based on an absolute magnitude of 17.94.

Naming 

As of 2018, this minor planet has not been named yet.

References

External links 
 Asteroid Lightcurve Database (LCDB), query form (info )
 Dictionary of Minor Planet Names, Google books
 Asteroids and comets rotation curves, CdR – Observatoire de Genève, Raoul Behrend
 
 
 

007025
007025
007025
19930816